The Revolution Starts Now is the 11th studio album by American singer-songwriter Steve Earle, released in 2004.

Earle received the Grammy Award for Best Contemporary Folk Album for this album at the 47th Grammy Awards held February 13, 2005 at the Staples Center in Los Angeles, California.

Track listing
All tracks composed by Steve Earle

 "The Revolution Starts ..."  – 3:10
 "Home to Houston" – 2:41
 "Rich Man's War" – 3:25
 "Warrior" – 4:11
 "The Gringo's Tale" – 4:33
 "Condi, Condi" – 3:08
 "F the CC" – 3:12
 "Comin' Around" – 3:41
 "I Thought You Should Know" – 3:46
 "The Seeker" – 3:11
 "The Revolution Starts Now" – 4:23

Personnel
Steve Earle - guitars, mandola, organ, harmonica, harmonium, vocals
The Dukes
Eric "Roscoe" Ambel - guitars, vocals
Kelley Looney - bass, vocals
Will Rigby - drums, percussion, vocals
Patrick Earle - percussion
Emmylou Harris - vocals on "Comin’ Around"
String quartet on "The Gringo’s Tale", arranged and conducted by Chris Carmichael:
Chris Carmichael - viola
David Angell - violin
David Henry - cello
Edward Henry - violin

Chart performance

References

2004 albums
Steve Earle albums
Grammy Award for Best Contemporary Folk Album
Artemis Records albums